Triprangode  is a village in Malappuram district in the state of Kerala, India.  India census, Triprangode had a population of 37175 with 17422 males and 19753 females. Three sides of the village is surrounded by water bodies.

Culture
Triprangode village is the site of the centuries-old Shiva Temple.

Transportation
Triprangode village connects to other parts of India through Tirur town.  National highway No.66 passes through Edappal and the northern stretch connects to Goa and Mumbai.  The southern stretch connects to Cochin and Trivandrum.   National Highway No.966 connects to Palakkad and Coimbatore.  The nearest airport is at Kozhikode.  The nearest major railway station is at Tirur.

References

   

Villages in Malappuram district
Kuttippuram area